The India–Pakistan cricket rivalry is one of the most intense sports rivalries in the world. The matches between India and its neighbour are known for its intensity. It is considered as one of the biggest matches in the world, and is among the most-viewed sport games. It is often termed as the El Clásico of cricket.

The tense relations between the two nations, resulting from bitter diplomatic relationships and conflict that originated during the Partition of British India into India and Pakistan in 1947, the Indo-Pakistani Wars, and the Kashmir conflict, laid the foundations for the emergence of an intense sporting rivalry between the two nations who had shared a common cricketing heritage.

The two sides first played in 1952, when Pakistan toured India. Tests and, later, limited overs series have been played ever since, although a number of planned tours by both sides have been cancelled or aborted due to political factors. No cricket was played between the two countries between 1962 and 1977 due to two major wars in 1965 and 1971, and the 1999 Kargil War and the 2008 Mumbai terrorist attacks have also interrupted cricketing ties between the two nations. After each terrorist attack in India, it was revealed that these terrorist attacks were planned by Pakistan, ISI, and Pakistan-based terrorist organisations. 
 
The growth of large expatriate populations from both countries across the world led to neutral venues, including the United Arab Emirates and Canada, hosting bilateral and multilateral One Day International (ODI) series involving the two teams and the teams have met during International Cricket Council (ICC) competitions. Tickets for matches in which the two teams play each other at international competitions are in high demand, with over 800,000 applications for tickets made for the 2019 Cricket World Cup meeting between the two sides; the television transmission of the match was watched by 273 million viewers.
 
Players from both teams routinely face intense pressure to win and are threatened by extreme reactions in defeat. Extreme fan reactions to defeats in key matches have been recorded, with a limited degree of hooliganism. At the same time, India–Pakistan matches have also offered opportunities for cricket diplomacy as a means to improve relations between the two countries by allowing heads of state to exchange visits and cricket followers from either country to travel to the other to watch the matches.

History

The Partition of British India in 1947 that led to the creation of independent Indian and Pakistani states was characterised by bloody conflict between ethnic groups that left one million people dead and led to the mass-migration of an estimated ten million people to the nation of their choice. The legacy of Partition and subsequent territorial disputes have helped create intense rivalries in field hockey, association football, and especially in cricket, which had been developed during British colonial rule and is the most popular sport in both nations.

Pakistan became a member of the Imperial Cricket Conference in 1948, becoming a Full Member in July 1952. Their tour of India later the same year saw the team play their first Test matches. They lost the first Test in Delhi to India, but won the second Test in Lucknow, which led to an angry reaction from the home crowd against the Indian players. India clinched the Test series after winning the third Test in Bombay, but the intense pressure affected the players of both teams to the point that they pursued mainly defensive tactics that led to drawn matches and whole series without a victory. When India toured Pakistan in 1955, thousands of Indian fans were granted visas to go to the Pakistani city of Lahore to watch the Test match, but both the 1955 series and Pakistan's tour of India in 1961 ended in drawn series, with neither team being able to win a single Test match. Complaints about the fairness of umpires became routine.

The Indo-Pakistani War of 1965 and subsequent War of 1971 put a hold on matches between the two sides that lasted till 1978, when India toured Pakistan and cricket between the two countries resumed for a brief period. In the post-1971 period, politics became a direct factor in the holding of cricketing events. India has suspended cricketing ties with Pakistan several times following terrorist attacks or other hostilities. The resumption of cricketing ties in 1978 came with the emergence of heads of government in both India and Pakistan who were not directly connected with the 1971 war and coincided with their formal initiatives to normalise bilateral relations. Shortly after a period of belligerency during the Operation Brasstacks war games, Pakistani president Zia-ul-Haq was invited to watch the India–Pakistan Test being played in the Indian city of Jaipur. This form of cricket diplomacy has occurred several times. Pakistan toured India in 1979, but an Indian tour of Pakistan in 1984 was cancelled mid-way through the series due to the assassination of Indian Prime Minister Indira Gandhi.

In the late 1980s and for most of the 1990s, India and Pakistan played each other only at neutral venues such as Sharjah in the United Arab Emirates and in the Canadian city of Toronto, where large audiences of expatriates regularly watched matches between the sides. The series between the teams in Canada in the 1990s and early 2000s were officially known as the "Friendship Cup". Sharjah, even though a neutral venue, was considered as the "back yard of Pakistan" given the close proximity and the massive support the team generated.

The rise of multinational competitions such as the Cricket World Cup, ICC T20 World Cup, ICC Champions Trophy, the Austral-Asia Cup, and the Asia Cup led to more regular, albeit briefer, contests between the two sides.

In 1999, immediately following Indian Prime Minister Atal Bihari Vajpayee's historic visit to Pakistan, the Pakistani team toured India for a series of Test matches and One Day Internationals. The Kargil War later in the year caused tensions between the countries and cricket was again suspended. Vajpayee's peace initiative of 2003 led to India touring Pakistan after a gap of almost 15 years. Subsequent exchange tours were held in 2005 and 2006 before the 2008 Mumbai attacks led to the suspension of India's planned tour of Pakistan in 2009 and all future engagements in Pakistan. India has refused to play any form of series against Pakistan since then.

The 2009 attack on the Sri Lanka national cricket team in Lahore led to the suspension of international tours of Pakistan, with no Test series played in the country for a decade and Pakistan was removed as a co-host for the 2011 Cricket World Cup which had been due to be played across the Indian subcontinent. India and Pakistan qualified for the first semi-final of the tournament and the Indian government invited the Pakistani Prime Minister Yousuf Raza Gilani to watch the match along with his Indian counterpart, Manmohan Singh.

Bilateral ties finally resumed when BCCI invited the Pakistan national team to tour India for three ODIs and two T20Is in December 2012. In June 2014, the Pakistan Cricket Board announced an agreement had been reached to play six bilateral series across eight years. After lengthy negotiations, involving offers and counter-offers on the venues and scheduling of the first of these series in December 2015, the boards were unable to reach an agreement. In May 2017, the BCCI accounted that it would need approval from the Indian government before a bilateral series could go ahead. There was no further progress, despite members of both boards meeting in Dubai to discuss the matter.

In October 2021, during the 2021 ICC Men's T20 World Cup, the teams played their 200th international match against each other. Pakistan won the fixture by ten wickets, the first time in 13 attempts that Pakistan had beaten India in either a Cricket World Cup or T20 World Cup match.

Summary of results

The two sides have played a total of 203 times. Pakistan has won 88 matches compared to India's 72 victories. In Test matches and ODIs, Pakistan has won more matches than India, although India has won eight of the twelve T20 International between the two sides.

ICC tournaments
India has the better record in ICC tournaments, with Pakistan registering its first ever win against India in a World Cup match during the 2021 ICC Men's T20 World Cup. In the Champions Trophy, however, Pakistan has won three of the five meetings between the two sides, including the 2017 ICC Champions Trophy Final. This was the second time the two teams had met in an ICC final, with India winning the 2007 ICC World Twenty20 Final in South Africa.

ACC tournaments
The teams have met on 17 occasions in the Asia Cup, including once when the competition used a Twenty20 format in 2016. India has won nine of these meetings compared to Pakistan's seven victories with one match finishing as no result in 1987 due to rain and bad light.

ICC tournaments won
The two countries have played in World Cups, the Champions Trophy, and the World Test Championship, all of which are organised by the governing body of world cricket, the International Cricket Council. In men's cricket, India has won the ICC Cricket World Cup, a competition in which sides play One Day International cricket, twice and Pakistan has done so once. Each side has won the ICC Men's T20 World Cup once, with the first edition of the tournament in 2007 featuring a final between the two sides which India won. In the ICC Champions Trophy, another ODI tournament, India won the trophy twice, although the 2002 Champions Trophy final was washed out twice and they shared the trophy with Sri Lanka. Pakistan won the 2017 edition, defeating India in the final. Neither team has won the World Test Championship, although India finished as runners-up in the first edition of the tournament which concluded in 2021.

In women's cricket, neither team has won the Women's Cricket World Cup or the ICC Women's T20 World Cup, although India has finished as beaten finalists twice in the Cricket World Cup and once in the T20 World Cup.

ACC tournaments Won

List of Test series

Overall Test match results

Fifteen Test series have been played between the two sides, as well as a one-off Test played in February 1999 as part of the Asian Test Championship. India has hosted eight of the series, with 32 matches played at home as well as the one-off match in 1999. Pakistan has hosted seven series with 26 matches played at home. Each side has four series wins, although Pakistan has won more Test matches than India in matches between the two nations.

List of ODI series

Overall ODI match results

The two sides have played a total of 17 ODI series. Six of these have been played in India, while Pakistan has hosted seven series. Four series have been played in neutral venues, including three in Canada between 1996 and 1998 and one in the United Arab Emirates in 2006. Pakistan has won 11 of the series with India winning five. The two-match series held in the UAE was tied, each team winning one match.

List of T20I series

Overall T20I match results

The teams have only played one Twenty20 International series, a two match series played in 2012 as part of Pakistan's tour of India. Each team won one match, leaving the series drawn.

Records

Test records

Team records

Individual

ODI records

Team

Individual

Twenty20 International records

The two sides have played each other nine times in Twenty20 Internationals (T20I). Six of these matches have taken place during T20 World Cups, including their meeting during the final of the 2007 competition, and one at the Asia Cup. A single two-match T20I series was played in India in 2012.

The highest team score made in a T20I between the two nations was India's 192/5 made at Ahmedabad in December 2012. In the same match Pakistan recorded their highest score against India, scoring 181/7. The lowest score in a T20I between the two counties was Pakistan's 83 all out made at Dhaka during the 2016 Asia Cup.

The highest individual score made in a T20I between the two sides was Virat Kohli's 82 not out made in October 2022 during the 2022 ICC World Twenty20. India's Virat Kohli holds the record for the most runs scored overall in matches between the two sides with 311 runs scored in seven innings.

The best bowling performance in matches between the sides was the 4/18 taken by Mohammad Asif during the group stage meeting between the teams at the 2007 ICC World Twenty20 in South Africa. India's best bowling performance was the 3/8 taken by Hardik Pandya during the 2016 WorldT20. Pakistan's Umar Gul has taken the most wickets in matches between the sides with 11.

Players who have played for both teams
Prior to the Partition of India in 1947 India had played cricket, having first played as an international side in 1932. Following Partition, Pakistan was created and began playing as an independent nation, making their Test match debut in 1952 during a tour of India.

Three players played for Pakistan after appearing for India. They are:
Amir Elahi – One Test for India against Australia at Sydney in 1947; five Tests for Pakistan against India in 1952
Gul Mohammad – Eight Tests for India between 1946 and 1955; one Test for Pakistan in 1956
Abdul Hafeez Kardar – Three Tests for India in 1946; 23 Tests for Pakistan between 1948 and 1958

After Partition, Gul Mohammad continued to play for India until 1955 and played against Pakistan in their first tour of India in 1951–52. Both Amir Elahi and Abdul Hafeez Kardar played for Pakistan on the tour. Abdul Hafeez Kardar went on to play for Pakistan against India during India's first tour of Pakistan in 1954–55.

Public and government reaction to the rivalry 
Cricket is a significant sport within both countries and matches involving them can provoke what has been described as "a strong response".

In the Indian cricket team in Pakistan in the 1989–90 series, the 3rd ODI at Karachi was abandoned due to crowd disturbance. When Pakistan lost 3 wickets at the score of 28, stone pelting started against Indian fielders. Indian fielders gathered near the pitch. Local cricketer Javed Miandad was unable to calm the crowd and the match was abandoned. Chandu Borde said that in the same match, Mohammad Azharuddin was hit with a metal hook. Sanjay Manjrekar wrote in his book, in the first ODI, that Indian captain Krishnamachari Srikkanth's shirt was torn by a Pakistani spectator.

There have been examples where fans of the opposing side have experienced legal action: in 2014, 60 students in the Indian state of Uttar Pradesh were charged with sedition for cheering Pakistan's victory over India, although the charges were later dropped; in 2016, a 22-year-old Pakistani fan of Indian captain Virat Kohli, was arrested and later sentenced to 10-years imprisonment for hoisting India's flag in Pakistan after a match between India and Australia. After the T20 World Cup 2021 match between the two teams, Indian authorities arrested a small number of Indian Muslims who had publicly celebrated Pakistan's victory.

After the 2021 match, a number of Indian players, most notably Mohammed Shami, the only Muslim player in India's team at the time, received abuse on social media sites, including threats against them and their families. India's captain Virat Kohli, publicly supported Shami following the abuse, much of which was Islamophobic in nature; Kohli subsequently received abuse and he and his family were threatened.

In the city of Leicester in the United Kingdom, tensions between the Indian Hindu and Pakistan Muslim community broke out into violence and a series of protests following the 2022 Asia Cup match between Pakistan and India on 28 August.

Notes

See also

India–Pakistan sports rivalries
India–Pakistan relations
India–Pakistan field hockey rivalry
India–Pakistan football rivalry 
List of sports rivalries

References

External links

 India vs Pakistan – All World Cup and T20 World Cup match results

 
Cricket rivalries
History of Pakistani cricket
History of Indian cricket
India in international cricket
Pakistan in international cricket
cricket